Danapur railway division is one of the five divisions of East Central Railway (ECR), a zone of the Indian Railways located at Danapur in Patna district of Bihar state in eastern India. The other railway divisions are Sonpur, Samastipur, Mughalsarai and Dhanbad.

Overview
It was formed as one of the six divisions in East Indian Railway Company on 1 January 1925 with Howrah, Asansol, Danapur, Allahabad, Lucknow and Moradabad. The Eastern Railway was formed on 14 April 1952 and Danapur division came under the control of Eastern Railway. After the formation of East Central Railway zone, the division was integrated into it on 1 October 2002.

Jurisdiction
The division includes twelve districts of the state of Bihar which are Buxar, Bhojpur, Patna, Luckeesarai, Jamui, Nawadah, Sheikhpura, Jehanabad, Nalanda and two districts of Uttar Pradesh which are Ghazipur and Chandauli.
Presently the Danapur division’s jurisdiction includes following sections:
 Jhajha to Kuchman
 Patna to Gaya (excluding)
 Kiul to Gaya (excluding)
 Dildarnagar to Tarighat
 Bakhtiyarpur to Rajgir
 Mokama to Simaria (excluding)
 Patna Sahib to Patna Ghat
 Patna–Digha Ghat line
 Fatwa-Islampur
 Rajgir-Tilaya
 Bihar Sharif to Daniyawan
 Mokama to Mokama Ghat (but not in operation now).

Stations under Division

As of 2014, Division has 232 stations out of which only Patna Junction railway station is categorized as A1 station & nine are categorized as A stations based earnings.

 Rest are not in operation.

See also
East Central Railway zone
Divisions of Indian Railways
Danapur Railway Station

References

 
Patna district
1925 establishments in India
Divisions of Indian Railways